Jo Rutten (20 May 1934 – 21 March 2007) was a Dutch equestrian. He competed at the 1976 Summer Olympics and the 1984 Summer Olympics.

References

1934 births
2007 deaths
Dutch male equestrians
Dutch dressage riders
Olympic equestrians of the Netherlands
Equestrians at the 1976 Summer Olympics
Equestrians at the 1984 Summer Olympics
Sportspeople from Limburg (Netherlands)
20th-century Dutch people